{{Infobox magazine
|image_file               = Cigarowl.gif
|image_caption             = "Old Owl", The Records "mascot"
|category= Humor magazine
|format              = 

|founded=1872, Yale University
|founder = <li> Edward Anthony Bradford <li> James Heartt VanBuren<li>Samuel J. Elder <li> E.H. Lemis<li> Henry Ward Beecher Howard
|firstdate= September 1872
|language            = English
|circulation         =
|based= New Haven, Connecticut
|website  = 
|title=|editor_title=Editor in Chief|editor=Clio Rose|editor_title2=Online Editor in Chief|editor2=Sam Leone|editor3=Adriana Golden|editor_title3=Chair|editor_title4=Publisher|editor4=Arnav Tawakley}}The Yale Record is the campus humor magazine of Yale University. Founded in 1872, it became the oldest humor magazine in the world when Punch folded in 2002."History", The Yale Record, March 10, 2010. http://www.yalerecord.com/about/history/

The Record is currently published eight times during the academic year and is distributed in Yale residential college dining halls and around the nation through subscriptions.  Content from the magazine is made available online and entire issues can be downloaded in .pdf form.

History

The Record began as a weekly newspaper, with its first issue appearing on September 11, 1872. Almost immediately, it became a home to funny writing (often in verse form), and later, when printing technology made it practical, humorous illustrations. The Record thrived immediately, and by the turn of the century had a wide circulation outside of New Haven—at prep schools, other college towns, and even New York City.

As Yale became one of the bellwethers of collegiate taste and fashion (especially for the younger universities looking East), so too The Record became a model—F. Scott Fitzgerald referred to the magazine as one of the harbingers of the new, looser morality of collegians of that time. But it wasn't just laughs The Record was serving up—during the 1920s, The Record ran a popular speakeasy in the basement of its building at 254 York Street (designed by Lorenzo Hamilton and completed in 1928).

Early 20th century

Along with the Princeton Tiger Magazine (1878), the Stanford Chaparral (1899), and the Harvard Lampoon (1876), among many college humor magazines, The Record created a wide-ranging, absurdist style of comedy which mixed high-culture references with material dealing with the eternal topics of schoolwork, alcohol, and sex (or lack thereof). Comedy first published in the magazine was re-printed in national humor magazines like Puck and Judge. 

In 1914,  J.L. Butler of The Yale Record and Richard Sanger of The Harvard Lampoon created the first annual banquet of the College Comics Association, which drew representatives from 14 college humor magazines to New Haven. The college humor style influenced—or in some cases led directly to—the Marx Brothers, The New Yorker, Playboy, Mad magazine, underground comics, National Lampoon, The Second City, and Saturday Night Live.

The character "Whit" (pronounced "wit") in the Sinclair Lewis story Go East, Young Man drew caricatures for the Yale Record.

Mid-20th century

From the 1920s to the 1960s, The Record placed special emphasis on cartooning, which led many of its alumni to work at Esquire magazine and especially The New Yorker. Record cartoonists during this time period included Peter Arno, Reginald Marsh, Clarence Day, Julien Dedman, Robert C. Osborn, James Stevenson, William Hamilton and Garry Trudeau.

From 1920 through the 1940s, many Record staffers and alums contributed to College Humor, a popular nationally distributed humor magazine. Additionally, comedy first published in The Record was re-printed in national humor magazines like Life and College Humor.

By the late 1940s, the magazine's ties to The New Yorker were so strong that designers from that magazine consulted on The Record'''s layout and design.

By the 1950s, the Record had established the "Cartoonist of the Year" award, which brought people like Walt Kelly, the creator of Pogo, to New Haven to dine and swap stories with the staff.

In the early 1960s, cartoons and comic writing from the magazine were regularly re-printed in Harvey Kurtzman's Help!, a satirical magazine that helped launch the careers of Monty Python's Terry Gilliam, R. Crumb, Woody Allen, John Cleese, Gloria Steinem and many others. 

In the late 1960s, the magazine played an integral role in editor-in-chief Garry Trudeau's creation of his epochal strip Doonesbury. Trudeau published the pre-syndication Doonesbury collection Michael J. (1970) through The Yale Record. In addition to editing the Record, Trudeau (and Record chairman Tim Bannon, basis of Doonesbury attorney T.F. Bannon of Torts, Tarts & Torque) organized Record events such as a successful Annette Funicello film festival, a Tarzan film festival (with guest Johnny Weissmuller) and a Jefferson Airplane concert featuring Sha Na Na.<ref>Keating, Christopher (November 28, 2010). "Doonesbury on Chief of Staff Tim Bannon: Garry Trudeau Speaks Out On His Friend From Yale's Humor Magazine". The Hartford Courant'. Hartford: Tribune Company.</ref>

Recent years
The 1970s and 1980s are known as the "Dark Ages" amongst Record staffers. Economic conditions in New Haven were abysmal and despite its impressive pedigree, The Record sputtered along, self-destructed and was revived numerous times throughout this period. Boards were convened and issues were published intermittently in 1971-1981, 1983, and 1987.Richard, Frank (1980). "The Vance Years: 1977-1980". Cover Illustration. The Yale Record. New Haven: Yale Record. Retrieved at http://images.library.yale.edu/madid/oneItem.aspx?id=3007599&q= on February 7, 2014.

Then in 1989, Yale students Michael Gerber and Jonathan Schwarz relaunched The Record for good. Their more informal, iconoclastic version of The Record proved popular, and a parody of the short-lived sports newspaper The National garnered national media attention. Gerber also created an ad hoc advisory board from Record alumni and friends, including Mark O'Donnell, Garry Trudeau, Robert Grossman, Harvey Kurtzman, Arnold Roth, Ian Frazier, Sam Johnson and Chris Marcil.

In the fall of 1992, Record contributor Ryan Craig founded popular Yale tabloid the Rumpus.

While The Record continues to publish paper issues, the magazine began publishing web content on April 1, 2001, well before many of its contemporaries.

Alums from recent years have gone on to write for many publications and entertainment companies including The New Yorker, McSweeney's, Saturday Night Live, The Late Show with David Letterman, The Onion and The Onion News Network.

Themed issues

Each issue of the current magazine features a particular theme. Aspects of the magazine include:
 Snews - One-liners in the form of headlines.
 Mailbags - Humorous letters to the editor, historical figures, or inanimate objects.
 The Editorial - Written by the editor in chief of the magazine each issue, giving a brief overview of the contents and making of the issue.
 Cartoons - Captioned, "New Yorker style" cartoons that hail back to the magazine's early beginnings.
 Lists and Features - Staff generated content pertinent to the magazine's theme.

Parodies
From time to time, The Record publishes parodies. These include (but are not limited to):

 The Yale Daily Record, a parody of the Yale Daily News (May 2016)
 "Yale's 50 Best Personalities," a Yale Rumpus parody (April 2015)
 The Yale Daily Record, a parody of the Yale Daily News (April 2014)
 Yale Bulldog Days Program Parody (April 2013 – 2016)
 "The Please Your Man Issue" (April 2009), a parody of Cosmopolitan
 "The Yale Protest Club: Fill Out Your Very Own YPC Petition!" (April 2008)
 "Parents' Weekend Brochure" (October 2007)
 Yale Blue Book Parody (September 2007)
 "Yale Map" (for visiting pre-frosh) (April 2007)
 Yale Blue Book Parody (September 2006)
 "Yale's 50 Best Personalities," a Yale Rumpus parody (February 2006)
 Yale Blue Book Parody (August 2005)
 "YaleRecordStation" (March 2004), parody of "YaleStation"
 Yale College Coarse Critique (September 2002), a parody of the Yale Course Critique 
 Yale Handbook Parody (September 2001)
 The New York Tomes (April 1, 1999), a parody of The New York Times
 The Yale Harold (1992), a parody of the Yale Herald
 Parody of The National Sports Daily (April 1991)
 Football Program Parody (November 1990)
 New Haven Abdicate (1990), a parody of the New Haven Advocate
 National Enquirer parody (1975)
 New York Times parody (1974)
 Yale Daily News parody (1970)
 The Reader's  (1967), a nationally distributed parody of The Reader's Digest
 Parody of The New York Times Magazine (1966)
 Parody of the Yale Alumni Magazine (1965)
 Sports Illstated (1965), a parody of Sports Illustrated
 Pwayboy (1964), a parody of Playboy
 Twue (1963), a parody of True
 Liff (1962), a parody of Life 
 "Fallout Protection" (1962) from the Department of Offense
 Yew Norker (1961), a parody of The New Yorker
 Reader's Digestion (1960), a parody of Reader's Digest
 Timf (1960), a parody of Time
 Sports Illiterate (1959), a parody of Sports Illustrated 
 Ployboy (1958), a parody of Playboy
 Daily Mirror Parody (1957), a parody of the New York Daily Mirror
 Le Nouveau Yorkeur (1956), a parody of The New Yorker
 Yale Alumninum Manganese (1955), a parody of the Yale Alumni Magazine
 Esquirt (1955), a parody of Esquire
 Tale (1954), a parody of Male
 Yale Daily News parody (1954)
 Paunch (1952), a parody of Punch Yale Daily News parody (1952)
 Yale Daily News parody (1951)
 The Smut! Issue (1951)
 Yale Daily News parody (1949)
 Record Comics (1949), featuring "Supergoon", a parody of "Superman", and "Hotshot Stacy", a parody of "Dick Tracy"
 The Shattering Review of Literature (1949), a parody of The Saturday Review of Literature Happy Hollywood (1947), a movie magazine parody
 New York's Fiction Newspaper (1946), a parody of the Daily News Record's Digest (1943), a parody of Reader's Digest Phlick (1939), a parody of photo magazines
 Parody of The Harvard Crimson (1939)
 Yale Daily News parody (1938)
 Real Spicy Horror Tales (1937), parody of pulps
 Yale Daily News parody (1934)
 Vanity Fair parody (1933)
 The New Yorker parody (1928 - 1929)
 Parody of Time (1928 - 1929)
 Yale Daily Clews (1927), a parody of the Yale Daily News Yale Record's Film Fun Number (1927), a parody of Film Fun Collegiate Comicals (1926), a parody of college comics

Master's Teas
Throughout the year, the Record invites notable figures from the world of comedy to "Master's Teas", informal interviews hosted by the Record in conjunction with residential colleges, at which tea is, in fact, not even served upon request. While residential colleges frequently organize Master's Teas, The Yale Record is known for its humorous ones. Guests have included:

 National Lampoons co-founding editor Henry Beard
 George Carlin of FM & AM, Class Clown and Bill and Ted's Excellent Adventure fame
 Senator Al Franken of Saturday Night Live, The Al Franken Show and Trading Places fame
 Brian McConnachie of National Lampoon, SCTV and Caddyshack fame
 Tony Hendra of National Lampoon and This Is Spinal Tap fame
 Robert Mankoff, cartoon editor of The New Yorker The Onion co-founding editor Scott Dikkers
 The Colbert Report head writer Allison Silverman
 Carol Kolb, former editor-in-chief of The Onion and former head writer of The Onion News Network; and Jack Kukoda, former head writer for Onion SportsDome, also known for The Onion News Network, Community, China, IL and Wilfred Arnold Roth, cartoonist
 Adam McKay, former head writer of Saturday Night Live and co-writer/director of Anchorman: The Legend of Ron Burgundy Upright Citizens Brigade co-founders Matt Walsh and Ian Roberts, and Lawrence Blume, director of Martin & Orloff Fred Armisen of Portlandia and Saturday Night Live Stella (David Wain, Michael Ian Black and Michael Showalter)
 Alec Baldwin of 30 Rock, Knots Landing, Beetlejuice, The Cooler, The Hunt for Red October, The Aviator, Blue Jasmine and MSNBC's short-lived Up Late with Alec Baldwin Neil Goldman of Scrubs and Community Comedy writer Mike Sacks
 Philip Seymour Hoffman, Oscar-winning actor known for Boogie Nights, The Big Lebowski and Capote Demetri Martin
 Wesley Willis
 John Mulaney, Marika Sawyer and Simon Rich of Saturday Night Live Comic artist Kazu Kibuishi, known for Copper Eric Metaxas was a writer for The Yale Record before becoming a renowned conservative personality. In the late 1990s he read his story He Ain’t Sneeezy, He’s My Brother about his experience with a fact checker from The New York Times for his humor article Gretel's Skull Discovered!

Pranks
Any good humor magazine worth its salt needs to pull some pranks. Here are some of the better ones:

 1902: The Yale Record pranked Carrie Nation, the famous temperance activist. Pretending to be a Yale temperance group, they brought her to Yale. During her visit, they took a picture with her. At the time, you needed to take pictures in the dark and then a single flashbulb would illuminate the scene. However, in the darkness, The Record rapscallions pulled out their mugs to create on the most iconic prank photos ever. The photo now hangs in the bar at Mory's and at the bar at the Yale Club of New York.
2015: The Yale Record hosted a mock protest on Broadway. The students called for Yale administrators to bring a second Kiko Milano store. “When we heard that Yale had decided to replace the affordable food store up on Broadway with Kiko Milano and Emporium DNA, we were really excited to have the chance to buy more luxury products at Yale because that was really hard before,” Gertler said.

"Old Owl"

For over a century, the mascot of the Record has been "Old Owl", a congenial, largely nocturnal, 360-degree-head-turning, cigar-smoking bird who tries to steer the staff towards a light-hearted appreciation of life and the finer things in it. Sometimes he succeeds.

Recently, the cigar that our fluffy feathered friend smokes has been deemed 'unsuitable' by the committee that governs Yale apparel. It is unclear when, if ever, this decision will be reversed.

"Old Owl" is a Cutty Sark connoisseur of some repute and enthusiasm. In artists' sketches, he is often portrayed as anthropomorphic, naked and lacking in any identifiable genitals, possibly the result of an old Cutty Sark injury.

As a nod to this lovable old coot and his off-the-wall antics, former chairpeople, editors-in-chief, and publishers are referred to as "old owls".

Documenting the birth of American footballThe Yale Record of the late nineteenth century chronicled much of the birth of American football:

 The Yale Record and the Nassau Literary Magazine of Princeton printed the only accounts of the first Yale-Princeton game (1873), the first game played using the Football Association Rules of 1873. These were the first consolidated rules in American football; before this, each of the handful of colleges that had football teams played by its own set of rules.
 The Yale Record documented the organization and playing of the first Harvard-Yale game (1875). Yale proposed the game. Harvard, which had just rejected an offer to join the association of soccer-playing colleges, accepted the challenge, on condition that the game be played with what were essentially rugby rules. These were the rules used by Harvard, different to the rules of the other colleges. Yale agreed to this condition and was soundly defeated. In reflecting on this crushing defeat, one Record editor blamed the loss on Yale's willingness to adopt the "concessionary rules", complaining that Yale "should not have given so much to Harvard."The Yale Record documented the creation of the Intercollegiate Football Association in 1876. The Harvard-Yale game of 1875 ushered in a national shift from the soccer form to the rugby form of football. Within a year, Princeton had adopted the rugby rules, and in the fall of 1876, Columbia joined Princeton and Harvard to form the Intercollegiate Football Association, which officially adopted English rugby rules. Although Yale agreed to adopt English rugby rules and played Harvard, Princeton and Columbia, they did not join the association as they favored a game with eleven rather than fifteen players, as well as points allowed only for kicked goals.The Yale Record documented the creation of the first American football championship. The Intercollegiate Football Association created the first championship game, which was played between Princeton and Yale on Thanksgiving Day in 1877. The teams tied to share the first national championship.
 The Yale Record documented Walter Camp's innovations in rules and scoring, notably the reduction of fifteen players to eleven, the establishment of the line of scrimmage and the snap, as well as the creation of downs.

Coining the term "hot dog"

According to David Wilton, author of Word Myths: Debunking Linguistic Urban Legends (2009), The Yale Record is responsible for coining the term "hot dog":

There are many stories about the origin of the term hot dog, most of them are false. Let us start with what we know. The first known use of the term is in the Yale Record of October 19, 1895...The reason why they are called hot is obvious, but why dog? It is a reference to the alleged contents of the sausage. The association of sausages and dog meat goes back quite a bit further. The term dog has been used as a synonym for sausage since at least 1884...

The magazine published its own history of The Yale Record/"hot dog" connection in its April 1998 issue.

Bladderball
Bladderball was a game traditionally played by students at Yale, between 1954 and 1982, after which it was banned by the administration.

It was created by Philip Zeidman as a competition between The Yale Record, the Yale Daily News, The Yale Banner and campus radio station WYBC. It was eventually opened to all students, with teams divided by residential college.

Notable alumni

Notable Yale Record alumni include (but are not limited to):

 Franklin Abbott
 Cecil Alexander
 William Anthony
 Peter Arno
 Grosvenor Atterbury
 Thomas Rutherford Bacon
 Donn Barber
 Hugh Aiken Bayne
 Daniel Levin Becker
 Lucius Beebe
 Clifford Whittingham Beers  
 William Burke Belknap
 Stephen Vincent Benét
 William Rose Benet
 Senator William Benton
 Peter Bergman and Phil Proctor of The Firesign Theatre
 Walker Blaine(editorial board, 1874–1875)
 Edward Anthony Bradford(editorial board, 1872–1873)
 Maj. Gen. Preston Brown
 C. D. B. Bryan
 Howard S. Buck
 John Chamberlain
 Walter B. Chambers(editorial board, 1886–1887)
 Yahlin Chang
 Roy D. Chapin Jr.
 George Shepard Chappell
 Cherry Chevapravatdumrong
 William Churchill
 Gerald Clarke
 River Clegg
 Thomas Cochran
 Elliot E. Cohen
 Charles Collens
 Paul Fenimore Cooper
 James S. Copley
 James Ashmore Creelman
 Raymond Crosby
Walter J. Cummings
 Ian Dallas
 Clarence Day
 George Parmly Day
 Julien Dedman
 William Adams Delano
 Edward Jordan Dimock
 Warren DeLano
 Rep. Charles S. Dewey
 William Henry Draper III
 Fairfax Downey
 Jaro Fabry
 John C. Farrar
 Henry Johnson Fisher
 Matt Fogel
 Karin Fong
Henry Ford II
 Jay Franklin
 Asa P. French(editorial board, 1881–1882)
 Michael Gerber
 Arthur Lehman Goodhart
 Ben Greenman
 A. Whitney Griswold
 Robert Grossman
 Philip Hale(editorial board, 1875–1876)
 William Hamilton
 Eddie Hartman
 Wells Hastings
 Clovis Heimsath
 Geoffrey T. Hellman
 David Hemingson
 Jerome Hill
 Hrishikesh Hirway
 Wilder Hobson
 Brian Hooker
 John Hoyt
 Cyril Hume
 Walter Hunt
 Richard Melancthon Hurd
 Rex Ingram
 Samuel Isham(editorial board, 1874–1875)
 Frank Jenkins(editorial board, 1873–1874)
 Ralph Jester
 Tom Loftin Johnson
 Lorenzo Medici Johnson
 Gordon M. Kaufman
 Stoddard King
 Eugene Kingman
 John Knowles
 Brendan Koerner
 Jason Koo
 Arthur Kraft
 Jack Kukoda
 Dick Lemon
 Robert L. Levers, Jr. 
 David Litt
 Huc-Mazelet Luquiens
 Dwight Macdonald
 Reginald Marsh
 Grant Mason Jr.
 Tex McCrary
 Thomas C. Mendenhall
 Charles Merz
 Eric Metaxas
 Glen Michaels
 Henry F. Miller
 Grant Mitchell
 Mahbod Moghadam
 Gouverneur Morris
John C. Nemiah
 Augustus Oliver
 Robert C. Osborn
 Jack Otterson
 Greg Pak
 Ed Park
 Sidney Catlin Partridge(editorial board, 1879–1880)
 Senator John Patton Jr.(editorial board, 1874–1875)
 Ronald Paulson
 Rep. Alfred N. Phillips
 Rep. James P. Pigott(editorial board, 1876–1877)
 Cole Porter
 John A. Porter(editorial board, 1877–1878)
 Vincent Price
 Kenneth Rand
 Erik Rauch
 John Francisco Richards II
 Clements Ripley
 Governor Henry Roberts(editorial board, 1875–1876)
 James Gamble Rogers
 Henry T. Rowell
 Stanley M. Rumbough Jr.
 John M. Schiff
 Preston Schoyer
 Charles Green Shaw
 Howard Van Doren Shaw
 Michael Shear
 Alan B. Slifka
 James Stevenson
 Brandon Tartikoff
 Malcolm Taylor and Charles Reed
 John Templeton
 Sherman Day Thacher(editorial board, 1882–1883)
 Daniel G. Tomlinson
 Garry Trudeau
 Sonny Tufts
 Frank Tuttle
 Jose Antonio Sainz de Vicuna
 George Edgar Vincent(editorial board, 1884–1885)
 Mayor Robert F. Wagner Jr.
 Ed Wasserman
 Hillary Waugh
Herman Armour Webster
 Edward Whittemore
 Herbert Warren Wind
 Jerome Zerbe

Guest contributors

Guest contributors to The Record have included:

 Judd Apatow
 Christopher Buckley
 George Carlin
 Michael Colton and John Aboud
 Scott Dikkers
 Neil Goldman
 Garrison Keillor
 Lewis Lapham
 Charles McGrath
 Adam McKay
 Bob Odenkirk
 Super Dave Osborne

See also
 Caricature
 Cartoon
 College humor magazines
 Humor magazines
 Parody
 Political satire
 Satire
 Sick comedy

References

External links
 The Yale Record
 Yale Fun: A Book of College Humor in Poetry, Pictures and Prose, Chosen with Loving Care from the Yale Record of the Past Eight Years; Conceived in the Sanctum, Founded on Foam, and Dedicated to the Humorous Faculty'', R. S. Peck, 1902

1872 establishments in Connecticut
Student magazines published in the United States
College humor magazines
Magazines established in 1872
Magazines published in Connecticut
Record